Rise to Power is the third and final studio album by American extreme metal band Battlecross.  It was released through Metal Blade Records on August 21, 2015. It is the only album to feature Alex Bent on drums. The first single from the album, "Not Your Slave", was released on 27 May 2015, followed by "Spoiled" on 29 June 2015.  On 19 August 2015, the album was made available for streaming at Metal Hammer.

Track listing

Personnel
Kyle Gunther – vocals
Tony Asta – lead guitar
Hiran Deraniyagala – rhythm guitar
Don Slater – bass
Alex Bent – drums

Chart performance

References 

2015 albums
Battlecross albums
Metal Blade Records albums
Albums produced by Jason Suecof